Orchestra of the Antipodes is an Australian early music ensemble founded by Antony Walker and Alison Johnston. They play baroque music on early instruments. They were founded alongside vocal ensemble Cantillation and the Sinfonia Australis orchestra. They received a nomination for the 2012 ARIA Award for Best Classical Album with their album Bach: Brandenburg Concertos.

Orchestra of the Antipodes often performs with the Pinchgut Opera and appears on many ABC Classics albums. Albums they appear on include Teddy Tahu Rhodes' The Voice (ARIA winner), Sara Macliver and Sally-Anne Russell's Bach Arias and Duets and Baroque Duets (ARIA nominees).

Discography
Orchestra of the Antipodes
Bach: Brandenburg Concertos (2011) – ABC Classics
Concertos, Suites & Overtures (2013) – ABC Classics
Sara Macliver, Alexandra Sherman, Christopher Field, Paul McMahon, Teddy Tahu Rhodes, Cantillation, Orchestra of the Antipodes, Antony Walker
Handel: Messiah (2002) – ABC Classics
Handel: Messiah Highlights (2003) – ABC Classics
Teddy Tahu Rhodes, Sinfonia Australia, Orchestra of the Antipodes, Cantillation, Antony Walker
The Voice (2004) – ABC Classics
Sara Macliver, Sally-Anne Russell, Orchestra of the Antipodes, Antony Walker
Bach Arias and Duets (2003) – ABC Classics
Baroque Duets (2005) – ABC Classics
Emma Kirkby, Cantillation, Orchestra of the Antipodes, Antony Walker
Magnificat (2006) – ABC Classics
Pinchgut Opera
Semele (2003) – ABC Classics
Purcell: The Fairy Queen (2004) – ABC Classics
Monteverdi: L'Orfeo (2005) – ABC Classics
Rameau: Dardanus (2006) – ABC Classics
Mozart: Idomeneo (2007) – ABC Classics
Charpentier: David and Jonathan (2009) – ABC Classics
Gluck: Iphigénie en Tauride (2015) – ABC Classics

ARIA Music Awards
The ARIA Music Awards is an annual awards ceremony that recognises excellence, innovation, and achievement across all genres of Australian music. They commenced in 1987.

! 
|-
| 2012
| Bach: Brandenburg Concertos
| Best Classical Album
| 
| 
|-

References

External links
Orchestra of the Antipodes at Pinchgut Opera

Australian classical music groups
Baroque music groups